The John J. Morrill Store is a historic store and Grange hall on Belknap Mountain Road in the central village of Gilford, New Hampshire. Built in the late 1850s, it is a well-preserved example of a period general store with Greek Revival features. The building has also served as the local post office and as a Grange hall. It was listed on the National Register of Historic Places in 1980.

Description and history
The former Morrill Store building is located in the center of Gilford village, at the northwest corner of Belknap Mountain Road and Potter Hill Road. It is a -story wood frame clapboarded structure with a gable roof. It is predominantly Greek Revival in style, with pilastered corner boards, and with entablatures and friezes above. A shed-roof porch extends across the main facade, supported by simple brackets. The first floor of the facade has two entrances: a nearly central double-leaf entry flanked by display windows, and a single-leaf entry at the left side, which provides access to the upper floors. A two-story frame addition extends to the left of the main block, with a -story addition extending further from that.

The structure was built as a general store in the late 1850s by John Morrill, but the business only lasted a few years. For this use, the ground floor served as the shop, and the upper floor was a storeroom. It served for many years as the local post office, and was purchased by the local Grange organization in 1909. That organization made a series of interior alterations to facilitate its use, converting the retail space into a kitchen and dining hall. In later years it added modernizations, including a modern heating plant. In the 1950s the end wing was adapted for use by the Junior Grange.

See also
National Register of Historic Places listings in Belknap County, New Hampshire

References

Commercial buildings on the National Register of Historic Places in New Hampshire
Greek Revival architecture in New Hampshire
Commercial buildings completed in 1857
Buildings and structures in Belknap County, New Hampshire
National Register of Historic Places in Belknap County, New Hampshire
Gilford, New Hampshire
1857 establishments in New Hampshire